Novaci is a village in North Macedonia. It is the seat of the Novaci Municipality.

Economy
The inhabitants are mainly farmers and livestock breeders, and some of them are employed in the local plants: REK Bitola, ZK Pelagonija and Macedonian Woods.

Demographics
According to the 1467-68 Ottoman defter, the village had 60 houses, 4 bachelors and 4 widows. The village predominantly displayed Slavic anthroponymy, with a small minority of instances of heads of families having traditional Albanian names, usually alongside a Slavic one.

According to the 2002 census, the village had a total of 1283 inhabitants. Ethnic groups in the village include:

Macedonians 1281
Others 2

Sports
Local football club FK Novaci plays in the Macedonian Third League (Southwest Division).

References

Villages in Novaci Municipality